The Haudenosaunee women's national under-19 lacrosse team represents the Iroquois Confederacy in international women's lacrosse competitions.  They are currently ranked tenth by World Lacrosse following the 2019 world championship. 

The Haudenosaunee U19 women's team won the 2015 Nike Cup - Orange Division championship defeating STEPS Lacrosse Philly. The team was forced to withdraw from the 2015 U19 World Lacrosse Championship in Scotland as the United Kingdom did not accept their Iroquois passports.

In 2021, the Haudenosaunee Nationals organization was disbanded and the women's team was rebranded under the Iroquois Nationals organization. In June of 2022, the Nationals dropped Iroquois from their name, adopting the name the Haudenosaunee Nationals.

Under-19 World Lacrosse Championship

Overall results

2007

2011

2019

Other tournaments and games

2010s

References

Lacrosse of the Iroquois Confederacy
National lacrosse teams
National sports teams of the Iroquois Confederacy
Women's lacrosse teams
Native American women
Women's lacrosse in Canada